$24 in 24 was a reality television series airing on the Food Network, which premiered on September 23, 2012. The show was hosted by Jeff Mauro. In each episode, Mauro went on a trip to a different city in the United States with only $24 to spend on breakfast, lunch, and dinner.

Episode Guide

References

External links

2010s American reality television series
2012 American television series debuts
English-language television shows
Food Network original programming
2012 American television series endings